Alphonse Wright (2 September 1887 – 10 November 1953) was a Belgian footballer. He played in five matches for the Belgium national football team from 1906 to 1907.

References

External links
 

1887 births
1953 deaths
Belgian footballers
Belgium international footballers
Place of birth missing
Association football midfielders